The Quidditch Premier League (QPL) was an elite quidditch league that represents the sport in the United Kingdom, France, Belgium, The Netherlands, and Germany. The league was composed of seventeen teams - four in each of the UK North Division, the UK Central Division, and the UK South Division, and five in the European Division. The QPL season ran from June to August every year, with each team playing three divisional fixtures in the regular season. The playoffs included all seventeen teams competing in either Division 1 or Division 2 the QPL Championship fixture in late August, with the winning team being named as the QPL Champions for that season.

History
The Quidditch Premier League was founded in November 2016 by Jack Lennard in hopes of developing quidditch further during the summer months in the UK's off-season. Lennard is the current Director of the League. The QPL was launched live on Sky News Sunrise and immediately gained international attention, with appearances in BBC News, ITV News, and even a mention on Conan. The first season debuted in June 2017, and saw the West Midlands Revolution crowned as the inaugural champions. In September 2017, two new teams were added; the Welsh Dragons, in the South Division, and the Scottish Thistles, in the North Division. These represent the first national Scottish and Welsh quidditch teams. The 2018 League was once contested across 3 fixtures in each division, followed by a championship at Cardiff Arms Park. The winners were the London Monarchs, who swept the board with an unbeaten season; the Southeast Knights finished as runners-up, and the 2017 champions, the West Midlands Revolution, came third. Before the 2018 season commenced, it was announced that the Quidditch Premier League would be establishing a European Division with five teams for the 2019 season. The new teams are based in Paris, Lille, Brussels, Amsterdam, and Cologne. It has also subsequently been announced that a further two UK teams would be debuting in 2019, based in London and North West/North East England, which will see the two UK divisions become three.

Competition format
The teams hold tryouts in their respective catchment areas during February of each year to select their squads of 25 players. Teams that share catchment areas, such as the London teams, the Northern teams, and the European teams, hold joint tryouts followed by a draft for prospective players. Each season features twelve divisional fixtures, three for each division, in June, July, and August, where all the teams in that division gather to play a round-robin format. The Championship fixture, held at a professional sports stadium, takes place at the end of August, and features all seventeen teams split across two Divisions based on divisional standings, and is a knockout event. Previous Championships have been held at Craven Park Stadium, Hull and Arms Park Stadium, Cardiff.

Teams

See also

QuidditchUK
International Quidditch Association
Major League Quidditch
Quidditch (sport)
Fictional Quidditch

References

External links
Quidditch Premier League official website

Quidditch competitions
Sports organisations of the United Kingdom
Sports leagues in the United Kingdom
Sports leagues established in 2016
2016 establishments in the United Kingdom
Professional sports leagues in the United Kingdom